Bruno Arthur Barreiro (born December 14, 1965) is a Republican politician from Florida. He served on the Miami-Dade County Commission from 1998 to 2018, representing part of Miami Beach and the Miami neighborhoods of Brickell, Little Havana, Coral Way, and West Flagler. He resigned on March 31, 2018, to run for Florida's 27th congressional district in the 2018 elections.

Early life and education
Barreiro is the son of Cuban immigrant parents and was born in Clearwater, Florida. He graduated from Christopher Columbus High School and attended the University of Miami in Coral Gables, Florida.

Political career

Florida House of Representatives 
Barreiro was first elected into public office in 1992 to serve in the Florida House of Representatives representing District 107. While serving in the Florida House of Representatives, he chaired the Tourism Committee.

Miami-Dade County Commission 
On June 2, 1998, Barreiro was elected to serve as Miami-Dade County Commissioner representing District 5. He served as Chairman of the Board of County Commissioners in 2007 and 2008. He was re-elected for subsequent terms to represent constituents in portions of the Cities of Miami and Miami Beach, as well as the communities of Little Havana, Downtown, and South Beach.

Barreiro was a key figure behind the Marlins Park baseball stadium in Miami, which attracted controversy due to its enormous cost to Miami-Dade County and benefit to Marlins owner Jeffrey Loria.

In 2018, the Miami Herald described Barreiro as "a powerful figure in Miami politics."

2018 U.S. House campaign

In May 2017, Barreiro announced he would run for Florida's 27th congressional district in the 2018 election, after incumbent Congresswoman Ileana Ros-Lehtinen announced she was retiring.

On March 31, 2018, Barreiro resigned his County Commission seat to run for Congress, following a change in Florida's resign-to-run law. Barreiro timed his resignation so that a special election would be called, in which his wife Zoraida could win his seat. Bruno used over $95,000 of his own campaign funds to support Zoraida, but Zoraida lost the June special election to Democratic candidate Eileen Higgins.

Barreiro's support of his wife's campaign weakened his ability to campaign against his eight challengers for the Republican House nomination, of whom the strongest was TV journalist Maria Elvira Salazar. Salazar ultimately won the primary election in August, in which Barreiro was the first runner-up.

Electoral history

Personal life

He and his wife Zoraida are parents of two children, Bianca Fatima and Bruno Antonio.

Barreiro is the owner of BABJ Investment Corporation, Marketing Vice President of Fatima Home Care and a Director of IUSA Partners, Inc.

References

External links

|-

1965 births
Living people
Republican Party members of the Florida House of Representatives
21st-century American politicians
American politicians of Cuban descent
University of Miami alumni
People from Clearwater, Florida
Hispanic and Latino American state legislators in Florida